The 2015–16 St. Francis Brooklyn Terriers men's basketball team represented St. Francis College during the 2015–16 NCAA Division I men's basketball season. The Terrier's home games were played at the Generoso Pope Athletic Complex. The team has been a member of the Northeast Conference since 1981. They were coached by Glenn Braica who was in his sixth year at the helm of the Terriers. They finished the season 15–17, 11–7 in NEC play to finish in a three-way tie for second place. They lost in the quarterfinals of the NEC tournament to Mount St. Mary's.

Preseason
The Terriers lost 4 players to graduation; point guard Brent Jones, forward Lowell Ulmer, swingman Kevin Douglas and forward Jalen Cannon. The biggest losses being Cannon and Jones, both of which led the team is various statistical categories last year and broke several program and conference records.

As of May the Terriers have added 3 players to their roster; Dagur Kár Jónsson, Jagos Lasic and Joshua Nurse.
Jónsson, averaged 17.3 points and 3.5 assists per game this past season for Stjarnan in Iceland's Premier Club League, where he was voted as one of the elite five players for the first half of the season. This summer he will play with the Icelandic national under-20 basketball team. 
Lasic is a 6'8" Junior College transfer from the New Mexico Military Institute didn't play much.  Yet, as a senior at Morgan County High School in West Liberty Kentucky, he averaged 21 points and 15 rebounds per game and was selected to play in the Kentucky-Ohio All-Star Game.
Nurse is a 6'9" forward from the Queens High School of Teaching. In his senior season, he averaged almost 11 points and 16.0 rebounds during the PSAL regular season, upping his scoring to almost 14 ppg. during the PSAL playoffs.

St. Francis will also have Keon Williams, Marlin Alcindor and Jonathan Doss join their active roster. All three players were redshirts last year. In addition, the Terriers will have a senior walk-on Miles Rockafeler who played his final year of high school at powerhouse St. Anthony's (NJ).

Departures

Incoming transfers

Class of 2015 signees

Season outlook
In Glenn Braica's first five seasons, the Terriers have made the NEC tournament each year.  Going into this season Braica has a combined 83–74 overall record and 54–34 conference record. Last year the Terriers won the Regular Season Championship, participated in the NEC Tournament Championship game and participated in the 2015 NIT. The Terriers, however were selected to finish 5th in 2015–16 NEC Men's Basketball Preseason Coaches Poll.

Regular season

Non-conference games

November
The Terriers opened their schedule on the road against Boston College, a 49–75 loss in which the Terriers never led. St. Francis Brooklyn missed their first 13 field goal attempts and shot 27.9% (17-of-61) for the game, the one bright spot being freshman guard Dagur Kár Jónsson who came off the bench to score 12 points, grab 5 rebounds, and dish out 2 assists. In their second game, the Terriers defeated Mount St. Vincent, a D-III program, 93–67 at home on 50% (30-of-60) overall shooting. The Terriers were led by Yunus Hopkinson's career-high 25 points and contributions from Glenn Sanabria (14 Pts, 1 Reb, 2 Ast, 3 Stl) and Jonathan Doss (13 Pts, 9 Reb, 2 Ast, 1 Stl, 1 Blk). As part of the Brooklyn Hoops Classic, the Terriers headed to St. Louis, Missouri to face the Billikens for the first time in their history. The Terriers lost 60–76 in a tightly contested game where the Terriers were down by just 4 points with 4 minutes to play; they were led by Tyreek Jewell (12 Pts, 6 Reb, 5 Ast, 1 Stl). The Terriers continued their Brooklyn Hoops Classic games and traveled to Louisville, Kentucky to face the Cardinals where they lost 41–85. The Terriers were led by Glenn Sanabria (11 Pts, 1 Reb, 2 Ast) and Tyreek Jewell (11 Pts, 2 Reb, 1 Blk) in the losing effort. The 44-point differential is the team's largest loss margin of the season. The next two games against Hartford and North Florida, as part of the Brooklyn Hoops Classic, will be played at Hartford, while Saint Louis and Louisville face-off at the Barclays Center. The Terriers lost against North Florida 65–78 to extend their losing streak to 3 games. They were led by Amdy Fall (13 Pts, 10 Reb, 1 Ast, 1 Blk) in the loss that saw North Florida shoot 63% from the floor in the first 20 minutes and 51% overall. The Terriers then snapped their losing streak by defeating Hartford 74–67, in a come from behind victory where Jewell and Hopkinson each scored 20 points. The Terriers closed out the month of November with a 2–4 record.

December

St. Francis Brooklyn recorded their second straight comeback win on the road, defeating the Lafayette Leopards, 69-62, on Wednesday evening at Kirby Sports Center. Senior wing Tyreek Jewell led the Terriers with 17 points and freshman guard Dagur Kár Jónsson added a season-high 15 points.  Junior guard Yunus Hopkinson contributed 10 points and handed out a team-high four assists, while senior forward Amdy Fall grabbed a game-high 13 rebounds. The Terriers win streak was snapped by St. John's, a 56–63 loss, in the ECAC Holiday Festival at Madison Square Garden. In the closely contested game, St. Francis was down 55–57 deep into the second half until St. John's pulled away. Despite placing five players in double-digit scoring for the first time this season, St. Francis Brooklyn fell to the NJIT Highlanders in overtime, 92–86. The Terrier losing streak extended to three games as they fell to Manhattan 60–71. 
St. Francis was led by senior forward Antonio Jenifer's career-high 17 points on 6-of-8 shooting yet the season-high 19 turnovers by the Terriers was too much to overcome. After missing three games it was announced that starting point guard Glen Sanabria would have surgery to repair his partially torn labrum in his left shoulder, ending his season. St. Francis snapped their 3-game losing streak against Liberty, 64–55. Seniors Tyreek Jewell and Antonio Jenifer combined for half of the Terriers scoring output, producing 32 points. The Terriers then traveled to Jersey City to face Saint Peter's where they lost 45–56. In the loss the Terriers shot 39% overall, 21% from the 3-point line and 44% from the free-throw line. In addition they committed a season-high 21 turnovers in the losing effort. The Terriers closed out their non-conference portion of the schedule with a loss against Albany, 66–71. St. Francis finished the mont at 2–5 and are 4–9 overall.

Northeast conference games

January
St. Francis lost their first two conference games on the road against Fairleigh Dickinson (77–86) and Mount St. Mary's (40–44, OT). At Fairleigh Dickinson, the Terriers were led by Chris Hooper's 19 points off the bench and Amdy Fall's 15 points, 10 rebounds, and 7 rejections. At Mount St. Mary's, St. Francis was led by Tyreek Jewell (13 pts, 8 reb) in the losing effort. The Terriers then snapped their four-game losing streak by defeating St. Francis (PA), 73–56. The Terriers led the entire game and defeated the Red Flash for the 6th consecutive time, as they were led by Tyreek Jewell (17 pts, 3 reb, 3 ast). St. Francis then defeated the Robert Morris Colonials, 56–49, behind a 14-point 10 rebound performance by Antonio Jenifer. With the win the Terriers climbed back to 2–2 in conference games. At Bryant, St Francis lost 59–61, in a game that went down to the wire, with the game winning shot made with 4 seconds left. Jewell (20 pts, 1 reb, 2 ast) and Fall (12 pts, 10 reb, 1 blk) led the Terriers in the losing effort. The Terriers then hosted Sacred Heart and won 85–67, behind a 23-point performance by Jewell. So far, the Terriers have been perfect at home (3–0) and win-less on the road (0–3). Against Wagner, the Terriers win-streak at home came to an end in a 59–83 loss. After the 9 minute mark, Wagner never trailed despite a strong effort by Chris Hooper (22 pts, 3 reb, 1 blk, 1 stl) off the bench. The Terriers next took to the road in the 41st Battle of Brooklyn against the LIU Blackbirds, where the Terriers won 64–49. The Terriers had 4 players with double-digit scoring and 2 with double-digit rebounds. St. Francis then lost at Wagner 61–64, in a closely contested game. The Terriers closed out the month against Central Connecticut on the road with a 60–49 win. The Terriers ended the month with a 5–5 record in conference play and 9–14 overall.

February
The Terriers opened the month with a loss against Sacred Heart, 70–74. St. Francis Brooklyn almost overcame a 17-point deficit but came up short as they were edged by the Sacred Heart Pioneers. Tyreek Jewell had a career-high 29 points and came up with a game-high four steals in the losing effort. St. Francis then won its next two at home against Fairleigh Dickinson and Central Connecticut. The Terriers upset then first-placed Fairleigh Dickinson 85–71, with five players scoring in double-figures. Against Central Connecticut State, the Terriers came back from 16 down to defeat the Blue Devils, 74–67. Hopkinson, fresh off a 24-point night in the win against Fairleigh Dickinson last Saturday, exploded for 27 points as he made 7-of-12 attempts from behind the arc and Jenifer posted his fourth double-double of the season with 22 points and 15 rebounds, both career-bests. The Terriers then hosted the LIU Blackbirds and lost 67–82. Senior forward Chris Hooper paced four Terriers in double-figures with 15 points in the losing effort. St. Francis then defeated Saint Francis (PA) 70–58 on the road. They were led by Yunus Hopkinson (20 pts, 3reb, 1ast, 2stl) and Chris Hooper (18 pts, 5 reb, 1 stl, 1 blk). With the win, St. Francis Brooklyn gained sole possession of sixth-place and clinched a berth in the 2016 NEC Tournament by virtue of Bryant's loss to Sacred Heart. The Terriers closed out the regular season with three more consecutive wins against Robert Morris (82–72), Bryant (79–72), and Mount St. Mary's (55–49). The Terriers ended the regular season with a three-way tie for second place in the NEC and were the 4th seed in the conference tournament because of tiebreaker rules. Their overall record stood at 15–16 and their conference record at 11–7.

At the end of the season St. Francis Brooklyn junior guard Yunus Hopkinson, senior wing Tyreek Jewell, and senior forward Chris Hooper were named to the Third Team Northeast Conference squad. In addition, senior forward Amdy Fall was named the Defensive Player of the Year for the second consecutive season. Amdy Fall became the fourth player in NEC history to repeat as Defensive Player of the Year. The senior forward leads the NEC and ranks 29th nationally with 2.4 blocks per game. He has racked up 208 career blocks during his time in Brooklyn, tops among active NEC players. Akeem Bennett (2010–11) and Greg Nunn (2000-01) are former Terriers who have also been tabbed NEC Defensive Player of the Year.

NEC Tournament
To end the regular season, the Terriers defeated Mount St. Mary's and would have to face them again in the opening round of the NEC Tournament. The Terriers with the 4th seed lost to Mount St. Mary's 51–60 at The Pope. Despite the loss, this is the 6th consecutive season the Terriers have qualified for the Tournament and their second consecutive year hosting games at The Pope.

Roster

Schedule and results

|-
!colspan=12 style="background:#0038A8; border: 2px solid #CE1126;;color:#FFFFFF;"| Non-Conference Regular Season

|-
!colspan=12 style="background:#0038A8; border: 2px solid #CE1126;;color:#FFFFFF;"| NEC Regular Season

|-
!colspan=12 style="background:#0038A8; border: 2px solid #CE1126;;color:#FFFFFF;"| Northeast Conference tournament

|-

Season statistics

Awards and honors
Amdy Fall
2015–16 NEC Defensive Player of the Year

Tyreek Jewell
Selected to the 2015–16 NEC men's basketball All-Conference third team

Chris Hooper
Selected to the 2015–16 NEC men's basketball All-Conference third team

Yunus Hopkinson
Selected to the 2015–16 NEC men's basketball All-Conference third team

Milestones and records
On December 10, 2015 the St. Francis Brooklyn Terriers attempted 49 three-pointers against NJIT, the most in conference history in a single game.

See also
2015–16 St. Francis Brooklyn Terriers women's basketball team

References

St. Francis Brooklyn Terriers men's basketball seasons
Saint Francis Brooklyn
Saint Francis Brooklyn Terriers men's basketball
Saint Francis Brooklyn Terriers men's basketball